The Saint and the People Importers is the title of a 1971 mystery novel featuring the character of Simon Templar, alias "The Saint". The novel is credited to Leslie Charteris, who created the Saint in 1928, but the book was actually co-authored by Fleming Lee. It is a novelization of the 1968 episode "The People Importers" from the 1962-69 TV series, The Saint, originally written by Donald James. The episode sprang from an original outline by Lee, though this was discarded by the time the story hit TV screens. For the novelisation Lee went back to the original premise.

Some sources such as the Saintly Bible website, list Charteris as co-author of this book, although he did serve in an editorial capacity on all releases issued during this period. For the first time in more than 30 years, the British edition (by Hodder and Stoughton) predated the American release. It was also the first Saint book to be released in paperback first, although hardcover editions followed. The book was first published in the United States by The Crime Club in 1972.

Plot summary
This novel captures some flavour of the early-seventies English society by thrusting its titular hero against the immigration rackets exploiting the masses of underprivileged Asian workers (in this case, Pakistani) during the times when England "called the Empire home". The action starts when, getting in a cab in London, Simon Templar spots a particularly lurid headline on the frontpage of a newspaper forgotten by some previous customer, describing the horrible death of a Pakistani immigrant in Soho.

1971 British novels
Simon Templar books
Hodder & Stoughton books